West Laurel Hill Cemetery is a rural cemetery established in 1869 in Bala Cynwyd, Pennsylvania. The cemetery was added to the National Register of Historic Places in 1992 and contains the burials of many notable persons.

A
Timothee Adamowski (1858–1943), composer, violinist and first conductor of the Boston Pops Orchestra
Green Adams (1812–1884), U.S. Congressman
Randolph Greenfield Adams (1892-1951), librarian and historian
David Hayes Agnew (1818–1892), surgeon
Raymond Pace Alexander (1897-1974),  American civil rights leader, lawyer, politician, and first African American judge appointed to the Pennsylvania Court of Common Pleas
Sadie Tanner Mossell Alexander (1898–1989), first African-American woman to receive a Ph.D. in the United States.
Harrison Allen (1841-1897), professor of comparative anatomy and medical zoölogy at the University of Pennsylvania
Sarah A. Anderson (1901-1992), first Black woman to preside over Pennsylvania House of Representatives general assembly
Robert Arthur Jr. (1909-1969), writer of speculative fiction
Samuel Howell Ashbridge (1848–1906), Philadelphia mayor 1899–1903

B
Hobey Baker (1892–1918), amateur athlete
Samuel L. M. Barlow II (1892–1982), composer, pianist and art critic
Richie Barrett (1933-2006), singer, record producer and songwriter
Joseph Beam (1954-1988), African-American gay rights activist, writer and poet
Cecilia Beaux (1855–1942), painter
Joe Berry (1894-1976), professional baseball player
Edward Julius Berwind (1848-1936), founder of Berwind-White Coal Mining Company
Frank Bettger (1888–1981), professional baseball player
Charles M. Betts (1838-1905), Medal of Honor recipient
Richard Binder (1839–1912), Medal of Honor recipient
Oliver Bosbyshell (1839-1921), Civil War veteran, superintendent United States Mint (1889-1894)
Catherine Drinker Bowen (1897–1973), writer best known for biographies, winner 1958 National Book Award for Nonfiction
Caroline G. Boughton (1854–1905), educator and philanthropist.
Benjamin Markley Boyer (1823–1887), represented  from 1865 to 1869.
Anna Robeson Brown (1873–1941), writer
Edward G. Budd (1870–1946), founder of the Budd Company
William M. Bunn (1842-1923), American newspaperman, Governor of Idaho Territory from 1884 to 1885
Jervis Burdick, (1869–1962), Olympic track and field athlete
Edward Bushnell (1876–1951), Olympic athlete

C
Alexander Milne Calder (1846–1923), sculptor
Alexander Stirling Calder (1870–1945), sculptor
Alan Calvert (1875–1944), weightlifter, bodybuilder, founder Milo Bar-bell Company
John Carbutt (1832-1905) photography and radiology pioneer
Arthur Beecher Carles (1882-1952), Modernist painter
William E. Carter (1875-1940), American millionaire, polo player, and survivor of the RMS Titanic
Emma C. Chappell (1941-2021), first African-American woman to form a commercial bank in the United States
Clarence Clark (1859-1937), financier, American tennis promoter and player, member of Tennis Hall of Fame
William Clothier (1881–1962), Men's Singles Winner, 1906 U.S. National Championships (tennis), member of Tennis Hall of Fame
Colin Campbell Cooper (1856–1937), Impressionist painter
Joseph K. Corson (1836-1913), Medal of Honor recipient
Peter E. Costello (1854-1935), Republican member of the United States House of Representatives for Pennsylvania 1915-1921
Cyrus Curtis (1850–1933), founder of Curtis Publishing Company, publisher of Ladies' Home Journal and  Saturday Evening Post

D
Frank Miles Day (1861-1918), architect
John Blair Deaver (1855-1931), aggressive surgeon at German Hospital known as "The Great Slasher"
Joseph H. Diss Debar (1820-1905), French-born American artist and government official
Giuseppe Del Puente (1841-1900), Italian opera baritone
Francis Xavier Dercum (1856-1931), neurologist, consultant for Woodrow Wilson after his stroke
Harry Diddlebock (1854–1900) sportswriter, manager St. Louis Browns
John Thompson Dorrance (1873-1930), president of the Campbell Soup Company
Cecil Kent Drinker (1887–1956) physician, founder of Harvard School of Public Health
Henry Sandwith Drinker (1880–1965) lawyer and amateur musicologist
Henry Sturgis Drinker (1850–1937) mechanical engineer, lawyer, author, and fifth president of Lehigh University
Katherine Rotan Drinker (1889–1956) physician, researcher of Radium Girls with husband Cecil
Sophie Drinker (1888–1967) author, musician, musicologist; founder of women's musicological and gender studies
Clarissa F. Dye (1832-1921) Army nurse during the American Civil War, president of National Association of Army Nurses of the Civil War

E
George W. Edmonds (1864-1939), Republican member of the U.S. House of Representatives from Pennsylvania, 1913–1925, 1933-1935
Loren Eiseley (1907–1977), anthropologist, poet, philosopher, best-selling author
George Emerick Essig (1838–1925), painter, watercolorist, and etcher who specialized in marine scenes

F
Beatrice Fenton (1887-1983), sculptor and artist
Larry Ferrari (1932-1997), American organist who hosted The Larry Ferrari Show from 1954 to 1997 on WPVI-TV 
Frank H. Fleer (1857–1921), inventor of bubble gum and pioneer of the baseball card
John Weiss Forney (1817–1881) politician, journalist, Secretary of the United States Senate 1861–1868
Robert Foster 1856–1921, professional baseball player
Daniel M. Fox (1819-1890), mayor of Philadelphia 1869-1871

G
Dave Garroway (1913–1982) American television personality, founding host and anchor of NBC's "Today" from 1952 to 1961
Jacob Augustus Geissenhainer (1839–1917), represented New Jersey's 3rd congressional district from 1889 to 1895.
Clarence H. Geist (1866-1938), financier who played an important role in the early history of Boca Raton, Florida.
Nelson Z. Graves (1849–1930), businessman
Nelson Z. Graves Jr. (1880–1918), cricket player
John Trout Greble (1834-1861), U.S. Army and Union Army officer
Robert Cooper Grier (1794–1870) Associate Justice of The United States Supreme Court (1846–1870).

H
Alfred C. Harmer (1825–1900), represented  from 1871 to 1875,  and from 1877 until his death in 1900.
Marvin Haskin (1930-2009), Professor and Chairman of the Department of Diagnostic Radiology at Hahnemann University
Herman Haupt (1817–1905), Union Army General and engineer
Lewis M. Haupt (1844-1937),  United States civil engineer whose career emphasized work on waterways
James M. Hazlett (1864-1941),  Republican member of the U.S. House of Representatives from Pennsylvania
Howard Head (1914-1991), aeronautical engineer who is credited with the invention of the first commercially successful aluminum laminate skis and the oversized tennis racket
Jocko Henderson (1918-2000), radio disc jockey, businessman, and hip hop music pioneer
Constantine Hering (1800–1880), early pioneer of homeopathy in the United States
George Herzog (1851-1920), interior designer and decorative painter
Brenda J. Payton Hill (1945-1992), as Brenda Payton, lead singer of doo-wop group Brenda & The Tabulations
John Hofford (1863-1915), professional baseball pitcher for Pittsburgh Alleghenys 1885-1886
Vera Huckel (1908–1999), one of the first female "computers" at NACA, now NASA
Edie Huggins (1935–2008), long-time television personality in Philadelphia
Hannah Clothier Hull (1872–1958), clubwoman, feminist, pacifist
Joseph Miller Huston (1866-1940), designed the third (and current) Pennsylvania State Capitol

J
Chevalier Jackson (1865–1958), physician, teacher, and father of endoscopy
Roy Jackson (1876-1944), early professional football player for Duquesne Country and Athletic Club
Bushrod Washington James (1806-1903), surgeon, homeopathist, writer, and philanthropist; namesake of Bushrod, Oakland, California
Anna Jarvis (1864–1948), originator of Mother's Day
Eldridge R. Johnson (1867–1945), founder of Victor Talking Machine Company
Emory Richard Johnson (1864-1950), economist who specialized in transportation issues, dean of Wharton School of the University of Pennsylvania from 1919 to 1933
Wallace W. Johnson (1842-1911), Medal of Honor recipient
Jack Jones (1950-1991), first African-American news anchor in Philadelphia market

K
John Ernst Worrell Keely (1837–1898), fraudulent inventor who claimed to have discovered a new mode of power
Roland Grubb Kent (1877-1952), educator and founder of the Linguistic Society of America
Martha Kimball (1839–1894), philanthropist associated with founding of Memorial Day
William J. Kirkpatrick (1838–1921), musician, composer of Away in a Manger
Charles Klauder (1872-1938), architect
Harold Knerr (1882–1949), illustrator, cartoonist, did comic strip The Katzenjammer Kids for 35 years
Daniel S. Koltun (1933–2014), theoretical physicist who specialized in nuclear physics
Irena Koprowska (1917–2012), cytopathology pioneer, co-developer of the Pap smear
Hilary Koprowski (1916–2013), virology expert, developer of first oral polio vaccine, developer of first H.D.C.V. rabies vaccine
Robert Lowe Kunzig (1918-1982), judge of the United States Court of Claims

L
John A. Lafore Jr. (1905-1993), Republican member of U.S. House of Representatives from Pennsylvania, 1957-1961
Robert Eneas Lamberton (1886-1941), 114th mayor of Philadelphia from 1940 to 1941
John Lawrence LeConte (1825–1883), 19th century American naturalist and entomologist
Donald Lippincott, (1893–1962), world class sprinter, medal winner at 1912 Summer Olympics
Sarah Lee Lippincott, (1920-2019), professor of astronomy at Swarthmore College, director of the college's Sproul Observatory
D. Herbert Lipson (1929-2017), publisher Philadelphia magazine
Walter R. Livingston Jr. (1922-2011), architect
Hy Lit (Hyman Aaron Lit) (1934–2007), Philadelphia radio & TV broadcaster
William H. Luden (1859–1949), developer of the menthol throat lozenge
Harry Lyons (1866–1912), professional baseball player

M
Harry Arista Mackey (1869-1938), football player and coach, lawyer, and politician who served as the Mayor of Philadelphia 1928-1932
Franklin J. Maloney (1899-1958), Republican member of the U.S. House of Representatives from Pennsylvania 1947-1949
Frank M. Mayo (1839–1896), stage actor
Katharine Elizabeth McBride (1904–1976) neuropsychology researcher, President Bryn Mawr College 1942-1970
Robert M. McBride (1879–1970) publisher and defendant in the obscenity prosecution of novelist James Branch Cabell
Samuel K. McConnell Jr. (1901–1985), represented Pennsylvania in the United States House of Representatives 1944–1957.
James McCrea (1848–1913), president of the Pennsylvania Railroad from 1907 to 1913
Henry Plumer McIlhenny, (1910-1986), connoisseur of art and antiques, world traveler, socialite, philanthropist, curator and chair of the Philadelphia Museum of Art
Robert L. McNeil Jr. (1915-2010), chemist and pharmaceutical industry executive, responsible for commercial development, naming, and introduction of the pain reliever Tylenol
Reuben Moon (1847-1919), U.S. Congressman
Robert Charles Moon (1844-1914), ophthalmologist
J. Hampton Moore (1864-1950), 108th (1920-1924) and 111th (1932-1936) Mayor of Philadelphia, Republican member of the United States House of Representatives from Pennsylvania (1906-1920)
Walter Moser (1881-1946), professional baseball player

N
Nellie Neilson (1873–1947), first female president of American Historical Society
Waldo Nelson (1898-1997), pediatrician, author of "Nelson Textbook of Pediatrics" and longtime editor of The Journal of Pediatrics. 
Wedgwood Nowell (1878–1957), stage and film actor and director

O
Ellis Paxson Oberholtzer (1868-1938), biographer and historical writer
Sara Louisa Oberholtzer (1841-1930), poet, anti-smoking and anti-drinking activist, and economist
Tinius Olsen (1845-1932), Norwegian-born American engineer and inventor
Charles O'Neill (1821–1893), Republican member of U.S. House of Representatives (1863-1871) & (1873-1893), member of Pennsylvania House of Representatives (1850-1852) & (1860 to 1861), member of Pennsylvania State Senate (1853-1854)

P
Daniel Pabst (1826–1910), cabinetmaker, worked closely with Frank Furness
Robert E. Pattison (1850–1904), Governor of Pennsylvania 1883–1887 and 1891–1895
Billy Paul (1934–2016), born Paul Williams, singer "Me and Mrs. Jones", "Am I Black Enough for You?"
George Franklin Pawling (1879-1954), President of Amateur Athletic Union in 1910s, builder of the Philadelphia Arena in 1920s
Teddy Pendergrass (1950–2010), soul and R&B singer
Joseph Newton Pew (1848-1912), founder of Sun Oil Company (now Sunoco) and philanthropist
Theodore Presser (1848-1925), founder of Music Teachers National Association, publisher of The Etude magazine, founder of Theodore Presser Company

R
Nate Ramsey (1941-2019), professional football player
Harry C. Ransley (1863-1941),  Republican member of United States House of Representatives from Pennsylvania 1921-1937
Al Reach (1840–1928), professional baseball player, sporting good manufacturer
Ira De Augustine Reid (1901–1968) sociologist and author who wrote extensively on the lives of Black immigrants and communities in the United States
John Reilly (1836–1904), represented  from 1875 to 1877.
Francis Richter (1854-1926), editor Sporting Life newspaper 1883-1917, refused presidency of the National League
Ralph J. Roberts (1920-2015), co-founder Comcast
Lawson Robertson (1883–1951), medal winner at 1904 Summer Olympics, renowned track and field coach
Mario Romañach (1917-1984), Cuban-born modernist architect, planner, and university professor
Jack Rose (1971–2009), musician

S
L. Lewis Sagendorph (1842-1909), inventor and pioneer in sheet metal production
Dennis Sandole (1913–2000), jazz guitarist, composer and music educator
William I. Schaffer (1867–1953), Pennsylvania State Supreme Court Justice
Fritz Scheel (1852-1907), first conductor and musical director of the Philadelphia Orchestra
Walter Schlichter (1866-1944) sports executive, co-founder and owner Philadelphia Giants Negro league baseball team, sportswriter for Philadelphia Item
John Roger Kirkpatrick Scott (1873-1945), member Pennsylvania State House of Representatives in 1899, 1909, 1911, and 1913
Edgar Viguers Seeler (1867–1929), architect
Coleman Sellers II (1827–1907), prominent engineer and inventor
Orator Shafer (1851-1922), Major League Baseball player
Taylor Shafer (1866-1945), Major League Baseball player
John O. Sheatz (1856–1922), Pennsylvania state representative, state senator, and state treasurer
Ben Shibe (1838–1922), sportsman, sporting goods salesman, namesake of Shibe Park at 21st & Lehigh
Rachel H. Shoemaker (1838–1915), founder of the National School of Elocution and Oratory in Philadelphia.
Matthew Simpson (1811–1884), notable Bishop of the Methodist Episcopal Church, delivered eulogy at funeral of Abraham Lincoln
Charles Emory Smith (1842-1908), U.S. Minister to Russia 1890–1891, U.S. Postmaster General 1898-1902
David Smyrl (1935–2016), actor and writer, known for his role of Mr. Handford (Hooper's Store) on Sesame Street
Albert Henry Smyth, editor of the Writings of Benjamin Franklin
Ed Snider (1933-2016)  Chair of Comcast Spectacor, owner Philadelphia Flyers, former owner Philadelphia 76ers, part-owner of Philadelphia Eagles
Alice Barber Stephens (1858–1932), engraver and magazine illustrator
John Batterson Stetson (1830–1906), American hat manufacturer and founder of the John B. Stetson Company
George H. Stockman (1833-1912), Medal of Honor recipient
Marion Stokes (1929-2012),  access television producer, civil rights activist, librarian, and archivist who videotaped more than 70,000 tapes of television news over 35 years
John Streaker, aka Cub Stricker (1859-1937), professional baseball player
Edwin Sydney Stuart (1853–1937), Mayor of Philadelphia 1891–1895, Governor of Pennsylvania 1907–1911.

T
Frederick Winslow Taylor (1856–1915), mechanical and industrial engineer, management consultant, and "father of scientific management".
Dorothy Burr Thompson (1900–2001), aka "DBT," classical archaeologist and art historian at Bryn Mawr College
Homer Thompson (1906-2000), Canadian classical archaeologist, specializing in ancient Greece
Joseph Earlston Thropp (1847–1927), Republican member of the United States House of Representatives from Pennsylvania 1898-1900 
John Cresson Trautwine (1810-1883), civil engineer, architect, and engineering writer
Horace Trumbauer (1868–1938), architect
C. Delores Tucker (1927-2005), civil rights and anti-rap activist
Ellwood J. Turner (1886–1948), Pennsylvania State Representative for Delaware County (1925–1948), Speaker of the Pennsylvania House of Representatives (1939–1941)
Thomas Lovatt Turner, aka Tink Turner (1890-1962), professional baseball player

V
Flora M. Vare (1874–1962), Pennsylvania State Senator 1925–1928, wife of Edwin H. Vare
William Scott Vare (1867–1934), U.S. Senator-elect, U.S. Congressman, Pennsylvania State Senator, Republican political boss
Moses Veale (1832-1917), Medal of Honor recipient

W
William Wagner (1796–1885), founder of the Wagner Free Institute of Science
Charles F. Warwick (1852–1913), author, lawyer, and Republican politician who served as mayor of Philadelphia 1895-1899
Grover Washington Jr. (1943–1999), American jazz-funk and soul-jazz saxophonist
George Austin Welsh (1878–1970), represented  from 1923 to 1932.
Donald H. White, composer, educator at Depauw University
Peter Arrell Browne Widener II (1895–1948), racehorse owner/breeder
Elwood N. Williams (1842–1921), Medal of Honor recipient
Henry Williams (1834-1917), peacetime recipient of the Medal of Honor
Hugh Irvine Wilson (1879-1925), golf course designer
James H. Windrim (1840-1919), architect
John T. Windrim (1866-1934), architect
Septimus Winner (1827-1905), songwriter
David Duffield Wood (1838-1910), blind composer, educator, musician, organist and choir master at St. Stephen's Episcopal Church for 46 years
Harry Wright (1835–1895), pioneer of professional baseball, member of the Baseball Hall of Fame

Y
Charlotte Yhlen (1839-1920), first Swedish woman to graduate as a physician from a university

Z
Ilya Zhitomirskiy (1989-2011), social media pioneer, cofounder Diaspora

References 

Burials at West Laurel Hill Cemetery
West Laurel Hill Cemetery